The Villas are an American indie rock band from Austin, Texas.  The band's sound is generally a mix of bright guitars with melodic vocal lines.  There have been comparisons to post-punk.  Following prior single releases, The Villas' first extended-play record Century of Tries was released in 2012.  Their music has been featured on popular mix tapes by HelloGiggles and BIRP!  The band played Austin's Pecan Street Festival in May 2012.

Origins
The band was started by songwriter Jonathan Berry and bassist Jay Cesak, formerly of Austin band Two Guy Trio.  Later additions of drummer Chris Thompson and guitarist Pete Mcgraw would round out the lineup.

Century of Tries (2012)

In 2012, The Villas released their first extended-play record, Century of Tries.  Recorded in Austin, Texas, the record was mixed by Reggie O'Farrell (The Fox Derby) and mastered by Joe LaPorta (Foo Fighters) at The Lodge (Mastering).

Lineup

(2011-2012 - Austin, TX)
Jonathan Berry - vocals, guitar
Pete McGraw - guitar, keys, vocals 
Jay Cesak - bass, vocals
Chris Thompson - drums

Discography

References

External links
 

Indie rock musical groups from Texas
Musical groups from Austin, Texas
Musical groups established in 2011
2011 establishments in Texas